The Swedish School in London is an independent school and boarding school in  the London Borough of Richmond upon Thames.

It consists of a nursery, primary school and secondary school for pupils aged up to 16 years, located near St Paul's School in Barnes, London, and a sixth form (gymnasiet) for 16- to 18-year-olds, in Richmond, London, co-located with Richmond, The American International University in London. The sixth form of the school has three programmes: a science programme, and a social science programme focusing on civics and a business administration programme focusing on economics.

The school was rated "Outstanding" in its most recent Ofsted independent school inspection report in February 2019.

History
The school was founded in 1907 in Harcourt Street, Marylebone, London W1. The lower school moved to Barnes in 1976 and the gymnasium was previously within accommodation rented from a sixth form college in Twickenham.

See also
 Stockholm International School – Anglo-American school in Stockholm

References

1907 establishments in England
Barnes, London
Boarding schools in London
Educational institutions established in 1907
Private co-educational schools in London
Private schools in the London Borough of Richmond upon Thames
International schools in London
Marylebone
Preschools
Primary schools in the London Borough of Richmond upon Thames
Richmond, London
Secondary schools in the London Borough of Richmond upon Thames
Swedish international schools